Choreutis atrosignata is a moth in the family Choreutidae. It was described by Hugo Theodor Christoph in 1888. It is found in the Russian Far East (Ussuri), Japan and China.

The larvae feed on Malus species and Ulmus davidiana.

Subspecies
Choreutis atrosignata atrosignata
Choreutis atrosignata sinica Diakonoff, 1984 (China)

References

Arctiidae genus list at Butterflies and Moths of the World of the Natural History Museum, London

Choreutis
Moths described in 1888